Pavlína Nepokojová (born 29 January 1989) is a Czech football midfielder, currently playing for Sparta Prague in the Czech Women's First League.

She is a member of the Czech national team.

References

External links
 
 
 

1989 births
Living people
Czech women's footballers
Czech Republic women's international footballers
Sportspeople from Hradec Králové
Women's association football midfielders
Czech expatriate sportspeople in the United States
Expatriate women's soccer players in the United States
SK Slavia Praha (women) players
AC Sparta Praha (women) players
Czech Women's First League players